Gartnerkofel (2,195 m) is a mountain of the Carnic Alps in Carinthia, Austria. It is located on the main chain of the Carnics above the Naßfeld Pass, near the border with Italy. The nearest town is Hermagor-Pressegger See. The mountain has two summits, and ravines fall down from its northern slopes, which are separated by rocky ridges. The normal route is from the northwest, from where it an easy climb across the ridge to the summit. The mountain is also a popular ski touring destination.

Wulfenia carinthiaca
The slopes of Gartnerkofel is the only place where the endemic angiosperm Wulfenia carinthiaca plant grows in the wild. It was first discovered in 1799 by alpinist and botanist Franz Xaver von Wulfen and is now a popular garden plant.

References

Mountains of the Alps
Mountains of Carinthia (state)
Carnic Alps